Trioceros hanangensis, the Mount Hanang dwarf chameleon or Mount Hanang chameleon, is a species of chameleon found in Tanzania.

References

Trioceros
Reptiles described in 2010
Taxa named by Wolfgang Böhme (herpetologist)
Reptiles of Tanzania